Petrorhagia saxifraga, known as tunic flower or coat flower, is a small, herbaceous flowering plant in the family Caryophyllaceae. It is native to parts of Europe and introduced to the United States and Canada, Great Britain, and Sweden. Petrorhagia saxifraga is also known as tunic saxifrage, pink saxifrage, or just pink.

It is a wiry plant with numerous branching stems, narrow leaves, and flowers growing solitary at the ends of branches. The petals range from pink to white. It is commonly cultivated in rock gardens and used along borders, escaping to grow in lawns, along roadsides, along shorelines, and in other sandy disturbed areas.

Tunic flower was originally described as Dianthus saxifragus by Carl Linnaeus in 1753 and renamed Petrorhagia saxifraga in 1831. The genus and species name refer to its natural habitat: rock crevices. Two subspecies are accepted:

Petrorhagia saxifraga subsp. gasparrinii (Guss.) Pignatti ex Greuter & Burdet
Petrorhagia saxifraga subsp. saxifraga (L.) Link

References

Caryophyllaceae
Plants described in 1753
Taxa named by Carl Linnaeus
Flora of Europe